Iōjima may refer to:
 An island known as Iwo Jima in English. In Japanese, it is officially known as Iōtō, although at one point it was officially also Iōjima
 Iōjima, Tokyo, a former village in Tokyo on the same island
 Iōjima, Kagoshima, one of the three islands that forms the village of Mishima, Kagoshima, Japan; one of the Ōsumi Islands
 Iōjima, Nagasaki, a former town in Nagasaki Prefecture, Japan

See also
 Iwo Jima (disambiguation)